In algebra, the free product (coproduct) of a family of associative algebras  over a commutative ring R is the associative algebra over R that is, roughly, defined by the generators and the relations of the 's. The free product of two algebras A, B is denoted by A ∗ B. The notion is a ring-theoretic analog of a free product of groups.

In the category of commutative R-algebras, the free product of two algebras (in that category) is their tensor product.

Construction 
We first define a free product of two algebras. Let A, B be two algebras over a commutative ring R. Consider their tensor algebra, the direct sum of all possible finite tensor products of A, B; explicitly,  where

We then set

where I is the two-sided ideal generated by elements of the form

We then verify the universal property of coproduct holds for this (this is straightforward.)

A finite free product is defined similarly.

References 
K. I. Beidar, W. S. Martindale and A. V. Mikhalev, Rings with generalized identities, Section 1.4. This reference was mentioned in

External links 

Algebra